Zinaida Voronina, born Zinaida Borisovna Druzhinina (also Druginina), (10 December 1947, in Yoshkar-Ola, Mari ASSR – 17 March 2001) was a Soviet gymnast who competed at the European, World, and Olympic level from the mid-1960s to early 1970s.

Training under Vladimir Shelkovnikov, Voronina's major debut came at the 1966 World Championships in Dortmund, Germany. There she won a bronze medal on the floor exercise, receiving the highest individual score of any gymnast at those games (9.933), which might have been the first time that any woman gymnast broke the 9.900 score barrier in the post-1952 era, presaging the perfect 10s that Věra Čáslavská would score the next year at the 1967 European Championships and the perfect 10s that Nadia Comăneci would score so famously at the 1976 Montreal Summer Olympics.

She went on to win several individual medals over the next four years, most notably at the 1968 Summer Olympics where she won the individual all-around silver behind Věra Čáslavská. At the same games, she became Olympic champion in the team competition.

Around the time of the 1968 games, she married Olympic gymnast Mikhail Voronin. Shortly thereafter she gave birth to a son, Dmitry, and came back to further successes at the 1970 World Championships, among other games. She attempted to make the Soviet team for the 1972 Olympics, but faced a strong competition and only placed 10th in the individual all-around at the national championships.

The same year she retired and started working as a gymnastics coach together with her husband. Saddled with her professional life and a difficult childhood (alcoholic mother, father she never met) she struggled with alcoholism. In 1980, she was divorced from her husband, who received custody of their son (he later became a competitive gymnast). Subsequently, she was sent out of Moscow for "anti-social behavior". She spent the remainder of her years working in a factory in Balashikha, Russia, dying in March 2001 at the age of 53.

In 1969, she was awarded the "Order of the Badge of Honor".

References

External links
http://www.gymn-forum.net/results.html
http://www.gymn-forum.net/Miscellaneous/USSR_Awards.html
http://www.gymn-forum.net/bios/women/voronina.html

1947 births
2001 deaths
People from Yoshkar-Ola
Soviet female artistic gymnasts
Olympic gymnasts of the Soviet Union
Olympic medalists in gymnastics
Gymnasts at the 1968 Summer Olympics
Medalists at the World Artistic Gymnastics Championships
Medalists at the 1968 Summer Olympics
Olympic gold medalists for the Soviet Union
Olympic silver medalists for the Soviet Union
Olympic bronze medalists for the Soviet Union
Sportspeople from Mari El